The Old Guys is a British sitcom that revolves around two ageing housemates: Tom Finnan (Roger Lloyd-Pack) and Roy Bowden (Clive Swift). The pair live across the street from Sally (Jane Asher), whom they both find attractive. Tom moved in with Roy after Roy's wife Penny deserted him. Baby boomer Tom has little in life but his daughter Amber (Katherine Parkinson), who is dating Sally's son Steve (Justin Edwards). Roy is a suburban pensioner who believes that he is one of the country's leading intellectuals.

It premiered on 31 January 2009 on BBC One, and aired on Saturday evenings. The show concluded its second series on 13 August 2010. The series has been repeated on Gold.

Production
The sitcom is produced by BBC Scotland, and is written by Jesse Armstrong, Simon Blackwell and Sam Bain. The show was commissioned by Lucy Lumsden, BBC Controller of Comedy Commissioning in 2008. It is recorded at BBC Pacific Quay in Glasgow.

In 2005, while in the early stages of development, a script for The Old Guys was used for a BBC Three competition, The Last Laugh, aimed at encouraging young writers. Along with seven other scripts for potential sitcoms, the first 13 scenes were published, and entrants invited to write the remainder.

Characters
Roger Lloyd-Pack as Tom
Clive Swift as Roy
Jane Asher as Sally
Katherine Parkinson as Amber
Vincent Ebrahim as Rajan
Justin Edwards as Steve

Title music
For its theme tune the series has used Ivor Cutler's distinctive song "I'm Happy", which can be found on his 1967 Ludo album. The theme song heard during the end credits is "Barabadabada" from his 1976 Jammy Smears album. Series 1 used the original recording of "I'm Happy", whilst Series 2 used a version performed by Lloyd-Pack and Swift.

Episodes

The Old Guys ran for twelve episodes over two series. All episodes are thirty minutes. The first series aired at around 9:30 pm every Saturday. The first episode gained 4.95 million viewers, an audience share of 22.5%. The second episode slumped slightly with 3.75 million (17.2%) viewers. The second series began on 9 July 2010 and ended on 13 August 2010. Both series of the show are occasionally repeated on Gold as part of their late-night broadcasting schedules.

Reception
The Old Guys received mixed reviews. David Chater in The Times stated, "There is nothing wrong with the comic performances, but such an unashamedly old-fashioned format is strangely at odds with its subject matter. Peep Show this isn't." The Daily Mirror commented, "Moved to a new home on Friday nights, where it's much-needed, the second series of The Old Guys feels as comfortable as a pair of slippers."

International distribution
In Australia the show originally aired on ABC1. In the US the first series is currently available on some PBS stations.

Home media
The first series of The Old Guys was released on Region 2 DVD on 28 June 2010. Both series are also available to buy on iTunes, despite the second one not being released on DVD.

References

External links

Review in the Leicester Mercury

2009 British television series debuts
2010 British television series endings
2000s British sitcoms
2010s British sitcoms
BBC high definition shows
BBC television sitcoms
English-language television shows